The 1925 Simmons Cowboys football team was an American football team that represented Simmons University (later known as Hardin-Simmons University) as a member of the Texas Intercollegiate Athletic Association (TIAA) during the 1925 college football season. In its second and final season under head coach P. E. Shotwell, the team compiled a 7–2 record and outscored all opponents by a total of 151 to 74. The team played its home games at Parramore Field in Abilene, Texas.

Schedule

References

Simmons
Hardin–Simmons Cowboys football seasons
Simmons Cowboys football